Meacher is a surname. Notable people with the surname include:

Harry Meacher, British actor, director, and playwright
Michael Meacher (1939–2015), British academic and politician
Molly Meacher, Baroness Meacher (born 1940), British life peer and former social worker